Trixter is the debut album of the band Trixter. It attained gold status, reaching #28 on the Billboard 200 chart. The album spawned three minor hit singles on the Billboard Hot 100: "Give It to Me Good" at #65, "Surrender" at #72, and "One in a Million" at #75.

Track listing

Personnel
Trixter
Peter "Pete" Loran – lead vocals
Steve Brown – lead guitar, harmonica, backing vocals
P. J. Farley – bass guitar, backing vocals
Mark "Gus" Scott – drums, percussion, backing vocals

Production
Bill Wray - producer
Jim Wray - associate producer, engineer
Chris Floberg, Brian Jenkins, John Karpovich, Dennis MacKay - engineers
Brian Foraker - engineer, mixing
Steve Sinclair - art direction, executive producer

Charts

Weekly charts

Year-end charts

References

1990 debut albums
Trixter albums
MCA Records albums